Football at the 2018 Asian Games was held from 14 August to 1 September 2018 in Indonesia. One of the host cities, Palembang, hosted the women's event, while the men's matches are played in Bekasi, Cibinong, Cikarang, and Soreang.

The Games' main stadium, the Gelora Bung Karno Stadium, Jakarta did not host the football events. The stadium hosted the ceremonies and the athletics.

All the top 20 nations sent their national football teams to the Asian Games excluding India. A total of 25 men's team and 11 women's team competed at the Asian Games. The Indian Olympic Association (IOA) refused to clear the Indian football team to participate in the tournament due its policy of only sending national teams that were ranked among the top eight at the continental level (India were ranked 14th at the time in Asia). The decision was opposed by the All India Football Federation (AIFF) who described the IOA as lacking "vision and competence", and that the IOA did not consider the recent form and upwards movement of the India national football team in FIFA World Rankings. This was the first time that the Indian football team did not participate in the tournament since the 1994 Asian Games. Several nations also refused to participate most notably including Tajikistan, Maldives, Yemen and Lebanon; the latter two teams will participate in 2019 AFC Asian Cup.

Competition schedule 
All times are local Indonesia Western Standard Time (UTC+7).

Venues

Men's venues

Women's venues

Participating nations and regions

Medal summary

Medal table

Medalists

Men's competition

The competition consisted of two stages; a group stage followed by a knockout stage.

Group stage

Group A

Group B

Group C

Group D

Group E

Group F

Ranking of third-placed teams

Knockout stage

Women's competition

The competition consisted of two stages; a group stage followed by a knockout stage.

Group stage

Group A

Group B

Group C

Ranking of third-placed teams

Knockout stage

References

External links
 Football at the 2018 Asian Games
Official Result Book – Football

 
Asian Games
2018
2018 Asian Games
Football